Liberation Army may refer to:

General
Earth Liberation Army
National Liberation Army (disambiguation)

Africa
Army for the Liberation of Rwanda
Azanian People's Liberation Army
Caprivi Liberation Army
Moroccan Army of Liberation
Sudan People's Liberation Army
Ambazonia Defence Forces

Asia
Arab Liberation Army
Liberation Tigers of Tamil Eelam
Balochistan Liberation Army
Palestinian Liberation Army
Liberation Army of Kampuchea
Karen National Liberation Army
Korean Liberation Army
Malayan National Liberation Army
People's Liberation Army
Russian Liberation Army
Viet Cong

Europe
Bavarian Liberation Army
Cornish National Liberation Army
Greek People's Liberation Army
Irish National Liberation Army
Kosovo Liberation Army
Liberation Army of Chameria
National Liberation Army (Albanians of Macedonia)
People's Liberation Army of Macedonia
Scottish National Liberation Army
Ukrainian Liberation Army

America
Black Liberation Army
National Liberation Army (Colombia)
Liberation Army of the South
Popular Liberation Army
Symbionese Liberation Army
Zapatista Army of National Liberation